Budzów  is a village in Sucha County, Lesser Poland Voivodeship, in southern Poland. It is the seat of the gmina (administrative district) called Gmina Budzów.

The village has a population of 2,400.

References

Villages in Sucha County